Podorungia is a genus of flowering plants belonging to the family Acanthaceae.

Its native range is Madagascar.

Species:

Podorungia clandestina 
Podorungia gesnerioides 
Podorungia humblotii 
Podorungia lantzei 
Podorungia serotina

References

Acanthaceae
Acanthaceae genera